Gonocephalus is also a synonym of the catfish genus Clarotes.

Gonocephalus is a genus of agamid lizards endemic to southeast Asia.

Taxonomy
Species from Melanesia and Australia which were formerly included in Gonocephalus are now placed in the genus Hypsilurus.

Species
, Gonocephalus contains the following 17 species:

Nota bene: A binomial authority in parentheses indicates that the species was originally described in a genus other than Gonocephalus.

References

Further reading
Das I (2006). A Photographic Guide to Snakes and other Reptiles of Borneo. Sanibel Island, Florida: Ralph Curtis Books. 144 pp. . (Gonocephalus species, pp. 81–84).
Smith MA (1935). The Fauna of British India, Including Ceylon and Burma. Reptilia and Amphibia. Vol. II.—Sauria. London: Secretary of State for India in Council. (Taylor and Francis, printers). xiii + 440 pp. + Plate I + 2 maps. (Genus Goniocephalus [sic], p. 157).

 
Reptiles of Southeast Asia
Taxa named by Johann Jakob Kaup
Lizard genera